Ju Yeongdae may refer to:

Joo Young-dai (born 1966), South Korean biathlete
Joo Young-dae (born 1973), South Korean para table tennis player